Antonio "Toni" Lanau (born 14 February 1966) is a retired Spanish hurdler who specialized in the 110 metres hurdles.

He competed at the 1987 World Championships, the 1988 European Indoor Championships, the 1994 European Indoor Championships and the 1995 World Indoor Championships without reaching the final.

On the regional level he finished eighth at the 1991 Mediterranean Games and also at the 1992 Ibero-American Championships. He became Spanish champion in 1994 and 1995, and indoor champion in 1994; Spanish high hurdles was otherwise dominated by Carlos Sala. His personal best time was 13.72 seconds, achieved in August 1987 in Barcelona.

References

1966 births
Living people
Spanish male hurdlers
World Athletics Championships athletes for Spain
Athletes from Catalonia
Athletes (track and field) at the 1991 Mediterranean Games
Mediterranean Games competitors for Spain